Kirkham may refer to:

Places
Kirkham, Lancashire, England
Kirkham, North Yorkshire, England
Kirkham, New South Wales, Australia
Kirkham (HM Prison), a prison in Lancashire, England
Kirkham Priory
Kirkham House

Other uses
Kirkham (surname)
Curtiss 18 T, a World War I triplane also known as 'The Kirkham'.